John Span Plunket, 3rd Baron Plunket of Newtown, County Cork (10 July 1793 – 16 April 1871) was an Irish peer and Queen's Counsel. He was the second son of William Plunket, 1st Baron Plunket, and Catherine MacAusland. He succeeded his brother Thomas Plunket, 2nd Baron Plunket in 1866. He married Charlotte, daughter of the eminent judge Charles Kendal Bushe and his wife Anne (Nancy) Crampton.

Family

Children of John Span Plunket, 3rd Baron Plunket of Newton and Charlotte Bushe:

 Most Rev. William Conyngham Plunket, 4th Baron Plunket of Newton, Archbishop of Dublin (26 August 1828 – 1 April 1897)
 Hon. Katherine Frances Plunket (d. 25 Aug 1881), who married Sir John Joscelyn Coghill, 4th Baronet.
 Hon. Charlotte Plunket (d. 30 May 1918), who married Thomas Barton and was the mother of Sir Dunbar Barton, 1st Baronet
 Hon. Louisa Plunket, who married Richard Greene (son of Richard Wilson Greene) and had issue 
 David Robert Plunket, 1st and last Baron Rathmore (3 Dec 1838 – 22 Aug 1919)
 Hon. Arthur Cecil Crampton Plunket (11 May 1845 – 21 Oct 1884), m. 10 September 1870, Louisa Frances (née Hewitt)

References

 "John Span Plunket, 3rd Baron Plunket of Newton" – The Peerage website

1793 births
1871 deaths
Barons in the Peerage of the United Kingdom
Younger sons of barons
19th-century King's Counsel
People from County Cork